Arcana was an American jazz fusion band that formed in 1995 and originally comprising guitarist Derek Bailey, bassist Bill Laswell and drummer Tony Williams. The original lineup released one album, The Last Wave, in July 1996, before Bailey left the band. Guitar duties for the second album were recorded by guest musicians Nicky Skopelitis and Buckethead, and Arc of the Testimony was released in October 1997. The band split up after the release of their second album due to the death of Williams in February 1997.

Band members
Bill Laswell – bass, six-string bass, eight-string bass, fretless bass, synthesizer, sound effects
Tony Williams – drums
Derek Bailey – guitar (The Last Wave)

Guest musicians
The following musicians contributed to Arcana's second album, Arc of the Testimony:
Nicky Skopelitis – guitar, twelve-string guitar
Buckethead – guitar
Pharoah Sanders – tenor saxophone
Byard Lancaster – alto saxophone, bass clarinet
Graham Haynes – cornet

Discography 
The Last Wave (DIW, 1996)
Arc of the Testimony (Axiom/Island, 1997)

References

Buckethead
American jazz ensembles
Musical groups established in 1995
Jazz fusion ensembles